Studies on Homer and the Homeric Age is a book written by four-time British Prime Minister William Gladstone in 1858, discussing a range of issues in Homer including an original thesis on colour perception in Ancient Greece. Gladstone was M.P. for the University of Oxford at the time of publication, but had been trained as a classicist.

Colour controversy 

The section of the book which has received the most mainstream attention is Gladstone's analysis of Homeric language related to colours. Gladstone raises the issue that the colours Homer attributed to many natural objects feel strange to modern readers. For example, Homer applies the adjective porphyreos, which in later Greek roughly means "purple" or "dark red," to describe blood, a dark cloud, a wave, and a rainbow, and he uses the epithet oinops ("wine-looking") to refer to the sea. Gladstone explained this by suggesting that the ancient Greeks categorized colours mainly in terms of light/dark contrasts, rather than in terms of hue.

Many readers, however, have read Gladstone's explanation of Homer's colour terms as a suggestion that he and the other ancient Greeks were colourblind. The most controversial line is his claim that "the organ of colour and its impressions were but partially developed among the Greeks of the heroic age." Gladstone denied that he suggested here the Greeks suffered from colourblindness, though, and he later said: "My meaning was substantially this: that he [Homer] operated, in the main, upon a quantitative scale, with white and black, or light and dark, for its opposite extremities, instead of the qualitative scale opened by the diversities of colour."

Later linguistic research indicates that the Greek language probably did not have a word for the color blue at that time.  Color names often developed individually, beginning with black and white, and then red, and only much later adding the color blue, probably when the pigment could be manufactured reliably.

See also
 Color term
 Wine-dark sea

Sources

References

External links 
 Free copy of the book on The Project Gutenberg

1858 books
English non-fiction books
History books about ancient Greece
Books of literary criticism
Oxford University Press books
Homeric scholarship
William Ewart Gladstone
Books written by prime ministers of the United Kingdom